Design, Build and Sell Scheme (abbreviation: DBSS) was introduced by the Housing and Development Board in 2005. Flats built under the scheme were meant for public housing and developed by private developers. They were built with supposedly better designs and mostly in matured estates such as Tampines, Ang Mo Kio and Bishan. There were 13 DBSS projects, totaling 8,533 units. The scheme attracted public outrage when a series of five-room DBSS flats developed in Tampines by Sim Lian Group Limited opened for sale at S$880,000, way higher than what could be afforded by most middle-class families. As HDB did not control the pricing of DBSS units being sold, the scheme was poorly received and subsequently suspended indefinitely.

List of DBSS projects

References

External links
 Procedures – Buying a flat under Design, Build & Sell Scheme

2005 establishments in Singapore
Public housing in Singapore
Real estate in Singapore